Tariq Malik, currently serving as Chairperson National Database and Registration Authority (NADRA) Pakistan for the second time, previously worked as Chief Technical Advisor United Nations Development Program (UNDP). Prior to joining UNDP, he also held the position of Senior Technical Consultant at World Bank.  He was a member of the core team who helped to initiate the worldwide ‘ID for Development’ (#ID4D) Program as well as authored the framework of international standards for digital identity.  Tariq is among the ten core members of technical experts group (TEG) of World Bank supporting client countries with ID planning and implementation. His name was included in the World's 100 Most Influential People in 'Digital Government' by a European think tank known as Apolitical  He was also named among Top 100 Digital Influencers in the 'Digital Community' by One World Identity (OWI)- a New York based independent identity research and strategy think tank focused on cyber security, digital commerce and risk management   Before joining World Bank  Malik helped governments to optimize use of Big Data and advanced data analytics from the platform of Teradata Inc. USA.

In his first term serving as Chairperson NADRA, he confirmed that the oppositions demand to verify that the 2013 elections were free and fair, is possible through thumb impression verification using the Biometric System.  He was then  terminated from his position without any reason by Nawaz Sharif government. However, he was immediately restored as Chairperson NADRA by the Islamabad High Court.  In its judgement, the Superior court of Pakistan instead issued a charge sheet against the government for intimidating, harassing and frightening him.

Some writers and analysts called this blatant act of government as e-bullying.

He then resigned afterwards, alleging extreme pressure from the government and unknown party workers who threatened to kidnap him and his family.

Malik worked on a multi-biometric system resulting in registration of more than 121 million citizens along their associated biometric attributes. CNN called him ‘Man on mission’ when he identified 3.5 million tax evaders in Pakistan using ‘Data Analytics’ coupled with biometrics. Tariq led similar projects and development based interventions in USA, Kenya, Nigeria, Sri Lanka, Bahrain, Bangladesh, Russia, Malawi and Tanzania. He helped various institutions of United Nations (UNHCR, ICAO, UNDP) and World Bank (Poverty Score Card, BISP, Disaster Management and ID Ecosystem), to accomplish development goals with transparency. Prior to that he served as Deputy CIO in Wayne County, State of Michigan, where he led design, development and implementation of an online Property Tax System.
Throughout his career, Malik has helped governments to improve service delivery using innovative technologies. Result-based achievements earned him various national and international awards. State of Pakistan conferred highest award in Technology – The ‘Star of Excellence’ (Sitara-e-Imtiaz) 2013 for using technology to improve governance. Malik won Teradata’s 2012 national ‘CIO of the Year’ award and was recognized at the 2009 ID World International Congress in Italy as the recipient of the ‘Outstanding Achievement Award’ for his work as an international biometrics leader. Malik holds master's degrees in both International Management (Heidelberg, Germany) and Computer Science (QAU Islamabad). His bachelor's degree is in Mathematics and statistics. He was trained at the JFK School of Government, Harvard University and Stanford University.
Malik's articles are published in publications like Forbes.

References 

Living people
Teradata
World Bank people
United Nations Development Programme officials
Harvard Kennedy School alumni
Stanford University alumni
Year of birth missing (living people)
Pakistani bankers
Pakistani officials of the United Nations
Pakistani government officials